Opisthopatus camdebooi is a species of velvet worm in the family Peripatopsidae. This species is light pink and has 16 pairs of legs in both sexes. Males specimens range from 15 mm to 18 mm in length; female specimens range from 12 mm to 14 mm in length. Also known as the Camdeboo velvet worm, this species is endemic to the Camdeboo Nature Reserve in the Eastern Cape province of South Africa.

References 

Animals described in 2022
Endemic fauna of South Africa
Onychophoran species
Onychophorans of temperate Africa